Brian William Bocock (born March 9, 1985) is an American former professional baseball shortstop, who played in Major League Baseball (MLB) for the San Francisco Giants and Philadelphia Phillies.

Amateur career
He attended Turner Ashby High School in Bridgewater, Virginia where he was a standout in both baseball and basketball. Bocock attended Stetson University in DeLand, Florida for three years, pursuing a degree in sports management. In 2005, he played collegiate summer baseball with the Falmouth Commodores of the Cape Cod Baseball League.

Professional career

San Francisco Giants
In his debut against the Los Angeles Dodgers, Bocock went hitless in one official at bat, walking twice.

For the first three weeks of the season, Bocock played almost every inning at shortstop. However, on April 20, the Giants recalled Emmanuel Burriss, a fellow shortstop. Bocock, whose batting average was consistently well below .200, subsequently received less playing time over the next three weeks.

On May 10, Bocock was optioned to Triple-A Fresno to make room for the returning Omar Vizquel who had been activated from the disabled list. Despite the demotion, he remained two levels above where he had played the previous year.

Bocock started the  season with the Connecticut Defenders, the Giant's Double-A affiliate. He was later transferred to the Class-A Advanced San Jose Giants. In 122 combined games in the Giants farm system, Bocock hit .230 with 26 doubles, two triples, three home runs, 51 RBIs and eight stolen bases.

On January 5, Bocock was designated for assignment by the San Francisco Giants to make room on the roster for the re-signing of Juan Uribe.

Toronto Blue Jays
On January 7, 2010, Bocock was claimed off waivers by the Toronto Blue Jays.

Philadelphia Phillies
On January 26, 2010 Bocock was claimed off waivers by the Philadelphia Phillies. On June 29, he was recalled from the Triple-A Lehigh Valley IronPigs to take the place of Chase Utley on the Phillies' roster, but was sent back to the minors a few games later.  That September he was added to the team's expanded roster, appearing in six games.

He was outrighted to Triple-A on July 1, 2011.

Pittsburgh Pirates
On August 2, 2011, Bocock was purchased by the Pittsburgh Pirates. He was assigned to the Indianapolis Indians of the Triple-A International League.

Toronto Blue Jays
On December 31, 2011 Bocock was signed by the Jays as a minor league free agent. On August 12, 2012, Bocock was promoted by the Blue Jays from their Double-A affiliate in New Hampshire to the Triple-A Las Vegas 51s. On November 3, he was designated a minor league free agent by Major League Baseball.

Washington Nationals
On December 13, 2012, Bocock signed a minor league deal with the Washington Nationals. In 22 games with Triple-A Syracuse, Bocock hit .182/.245/.250 with 3XBH and 2RBI.

Return to Pirates organization
On July 10, 2013, Bocock was traded to the Pirates as the player to be named later, completing the Brian Jeroloman deal. He reported to Triple-A Indianapolis.

Kansas City Royals
On December 5, 2013 Bocock signed a minor league contract with the Kansas City Royals.

References

External links

1985 births
Living people
San Francisco Giants players
Philadelphia Phillies players
Stetson Hatters baseball players
Falmouth Commodores players
Salem-Keizer Volcanoes players
Augusta GreenJackets players
San Jose Giants players
Fresno Grizzlies players
Connecticut Defenders players
Lehigh Valley IronPigs players
Clearwater Threshers players
Indianapolis Indians players
New Hampshire Fisher Cats players
Las Vegas 51s players
Syracuse Chiefs players
Northwest Arkansas Naturals players
Omaha Storm Chasers players
Major League Baseball shortstops
Baseball players from Virginia
People from Harrisonburg, Virginia
Minor league baseball coaches
Baseball coaches from Virginia